Zhou Hongzhuan (born December 12, 1988) is a Paralympian athlete from China competing mainly in category T53 sprint and mid-distance events.

She competed in the 2008 Summer Paralympics in Beijing, China.  There she won a gold medal in the women's 800 metres — T53 event, a silver medal in the women's 400 metres — T53 event and a bronze medal in the women's 200 metres — T53 event.

At the 2012 Summer Paralympics in London, United Kingdom she won a silver medal in the women's 100 metres T53 event, a bronze medal in the women's 200 metres T53 event, a gold medal in the women's 4000 metres T53 event and a gold medal in the 800 metres T53 event.

External links
 

1988 births
Living people
Chinese female sprinters
Paralympic athletes of China
Paralympic gold medalists for China
Paralympic silver medalists for China
Paralympic bronze medalists for China
Athletes (track and field) at the 2008 Summer Paralympics
Athletes (track and field) at the 2012 Summer Paralympics
Athletes (track and field) at the 2016 Summer Paralympics
Medalists at the 2008 Summer Paralympics
Medalists at the 2012 Summer Paralympics
Medalists at the 2016 Summer Paralympics
Runners from Hebei
Paralympic medalists in athletics (track and field)
Athletes (track and field) at the 2020 Summer Paralympics
20th-century Chinese women
21st-century Chinese women